P. lepidus may refer to:
 Philanthus lepidus, a wasp species in the genus Philanthus
 Pisenor lepidus, a spider species in the genus Pisenor
 Poecilus lepidus, a beetle species in the genus Poecilus
 Proprioseiopsis lepidus, a mite species in the genus Proprioseiopsis

See also
 Lepidus (disambiguation)